A layette is a collection of clothing and accessories for a newborn child.  The term "layette set" is commonly used in the United States to refer to sets of baby clothes. In the 1920s, expectant mothers or their friends and relatives frequently knitted a matching layette set, consisting of a blanket, hat, sweater and booties. That tradition has continued to the present day.

Traditionally, women would often hand-sew or knit their baby's clothes during their pregnancy. Today "layette" is often used to identify a baby clothing section of a store. The term can also be used for bedding, accessories, and baby care items.

Basic layette 

Although there is no strict definition of the items included in a layette, basic layette items often include:
a going-home-from-the-hospital (or birth center) outfit
legless sleepwear (sleeping gowns / kimono / sleeping bags / newborn sacques / blanket sleepers) or footed sleepers
onesies (short-sleeved, legless bodysuits) / all-in-ones / rompers / coveralls
undershirts / T-shirts
receiving blankets
swaddling blankets
hooded towels
baby washcloths
cloth diapers (nappies)
socks / bootees
hats / beanies / sweaters / bunting (depending on the climate)
burp cloths (cloth diapers are often recommended)
Scratch mitts 
Vests
baby rattles
 teethers  
pacifiers (dummies)
baby bottles

See also
 Maternity package

Further reading
 Baby care for health and comfort (c1944). Bureau of Educational Services, Byron G. Moon Company.  Poster 65 x 51 cm. National Library of Medicine accession number: 04-08.

References

Infants' clothing